Milan Ivanović (Serbian Cyrillic: Милан Ивановић, ; born 21 December 1960 in Sivac, SR Serbia, SFR Yugoslavia) is a former Serbian Australian football (soccer) player. He also played for Australian national team.

Club career
Ivanović started his career with a local club Crvenka. After stints with Rudar Kostolac and OFK Belgrade, he joined Red Star Belgrade in 1985. Ivanović played in a 1988 European Cup encounter against A.C. Milan.

He emigrated to Australia and on arrival in 1989 he joined Adelaide City in the National Soccer League. Nicknamed "The Doctor" for his ability to cut out the opposition's attacks and launch into an incisive midfield run, the classy, composed sweeper formed a formidable partnership with Alex Tobin that became the mainstay of the Adelaide City and Socceroo defence. That resulted in two national titles in 1992 and 1994, cementing his legendary status.

In 2007, Ivanović came out of retirement to play in the South Australian Premier League club, Northern Demons.

International career
Ivanović made his first international appearance for Australia in 1991. He captained Australia once, in a match against Japan on 15 February 1998, which also his last appearance for Australia. Ivanović made 59 international appearances for Australia.

In 2000, he was selected as a member of the Australian "Team of the Century" by respondents to a worldwide Rec.Sport.Soccer Statistics Foundation vote, beating Paul Okon into second place for a position in central defense.

Managerial career
Ivanović has coached at local level in South Australia, in both Federation and Amateur leagues. He has been in charge at both Enfield City and White City and saved the latter club from relegation in 2006. Currently Coaching U/19's at Croydon Kings (Polonia) Soccer Club in South Australia. He is now currently the Head Soccer coach at Scotch College Adelaide.

Honours
With Australia:
 FIFA Confederations Cup: 1997 (Runners-Up)
 OFC Nations Cup: 1996
With Adelaide City:
 National Soccer League: 1991–1992, 1993–1994
 NSL Cup: 1989, 1991–1992
Personal honours:
 FFA Hall of Fame Inductee - 2003
 Johnny Warren Medal: 1990–1991 with Adelaide City
 Joe Marston Medal: 1992–1993 with Adelaide City
 RSSSF Australian Team of the Century: 2000

References

External links

1960 births
Living people
People from Kula, Serbia
Serbian emigrants to Australia
Yugoslav First League players
Australian soccer players
Red Star Belgrade footballers
OFK Beograd players
FK Radnički Niš players
Adelaide City FC players
National Soccer League (Australia) players
Association football defenders
FK Beograd (Australia) players
Campbelltown City SC players
Australian people of Serbian descent
Australia international soccer players
1996 OFC Nations Cup players
1997 FIFA Confederations Cup players